Romane Dieu (born 19 December 2000) is a French former ski jumper who competed at World Cup level from 2017 to 2018.

Career
Dieu's best individual World Cup result was 26th place in Hinzenbach on 4 February 2017. Her best team result was third in Hinterzarten on 16 December 2017, in what was first ever women's World Cup team competition.

At the 2017 European Youth Olympic Winter Festival in Erzurum, Dieu won an individual gold medal and a team silver medal. At the 2018 Junior World Championships in Kandersteg, she won a team bronze medal.

References

2000 births
Living people
French female ski jumpers
Ski jumpers at the 2016 Winter Youth Olympics